Huras is a 1996 Maldivian comedy drama film written and directed by Amjad Ibrahim. Produced by Hussain Rasheed under Farivaa Films, the film stars Hassan Afeef, Mariyam Rasheedha, Vazuna Ahmed, Koyya Hassan Manik and Arifa Ibrahim in pivotal roles.

The film marks Amjad Ibrahim's first direction. The project was expanded solely with the intention of winning Gaumee Film Awards. However, the film failed to garner any award at 2nd Gaumee Film Awards ceremony which resulted Ibrahim focusing more into commercial film making.

Plot
Zeeniya (Mariyam Rasheedha) and Soniya (Vazuna Ahmed) are two rival siblings studying in the same class. Anil (Hassan Afeef) is their new recruited teacher who is romantically attracted to Zeeniya. Soniya discovers a photograph of Anil on Zeeniya's bed and intends to break their relationship. Zeeniya and Anil's affair spread in the island which their aunt, Hawwa (Arifa Ibrahim) differs to believe. 

Anil took his students on a picnic trip to a nearby island where Soiya witnesses their true love. Hawwa confronts Zeeniya to end her relationship with Anil but she secretly kept meeting him every day. Upon hearing the news, enraged, Zeeniya's brother Adam Manik (Koyya Hassan Manik) tears her uniform and restricts her from going outside. Zeeniya and Anil were caught in a room. Adam Manik assaults Anil and dragged Zeeniya to home.

Cast 
 Hassan Afeef as Anil
 Mariyam Rasheedha as Zeeniya
 Vazuna Ahmed as Soniya
 Koyya Hassan Manik as Adam Manik
 Arifa Ibrahim as Hawwa
 Chilhiya Moosa Manik (special appearance)

Soundtrack

References

1996 films
Maldivian comedy-drama films
Films directed by Amjad Ibrahim
1996 comedy-drama films
Dhivehi-language films